Akjoujt is a department of Inchiri in Mauritania.

The capital lies at Akjoujt. The other village is Benichab.

References 

Departments of Mauritania